is a JR West Kabe Line station located in Nagatsuka, Asaminami-ku, Hiroshima, Hiroshima Prefecture, Japan.

History
1928-11-19: Daishi Station opens
May 1930—June 1931: The station name is changed to Nagatsuka Station at some point during this time
1936-09-01: The station name is changed to Aki-Nagatsuka Station
1987-04-01: Japanese National Railways is privatized, and Aki-Nagatsuka Station becomes a JR West station
2015-11-28: Additional platform serving  bound trains was opened

Station layout
Aki-Nagatsuka Station features two narrow side platforms serving two tracks. The station initially had one island platform, but a new side platform serving  bound trains was opened on November 28, 2015. After the opening of the new side platform, the old island platform was converted to serve only  bound trains, and was fenced off from the  bound track. The station building is located north-west of the platforms, and is shaped like an octagon. A railway crossing connects the  bound platform to the station building. The station is staffed and features automated ticket machines as well.

Platforms

Surrounding Area
 Japan National Route 54
Hiroshima Asaminami Post Office
Hiroshima Nagatsuka Post Office
Hiroshima Municipal Nagatsuka Elementary School
Hiroshima Municipal Nishi Nagatsuka Elementary School
Hiroshima Municipal Nagatsuka Junior High School
Hiroshima Bunka Two-Year College
Ōta River (太田川)

External links

 JR West

Kabe Line
Hiroshima City Network
Stations of West Japan Railway Company in Hiroshima city
Railway stations in Japan opened in 1928